Schepp is a surname. Notable people with the surname include:

 Adolf Schepp (1837–1905), German mathematician 
 Auguste Schepp (1846–1905), German painter
 Emelie Schepp (born 1979), Swedish crime author
 Guste Schepp  (1886-1967), German politician and women's rights activist

German-language surnames